Stay is the debut studio album by Canadian singer and rapper Safe. It was released on May 9, 2019, by RCA Records. It features guest appearances from Playboi Carti and Quin.

Background
The album features guest appearances from American rapper Playboi Carti and American singer Quin. It follows up from his 2015 debut mixtape Stay Down. The album comes after working with the likes of the late Smoke Dawg, Bibi Bourelly and Khalid for his second studio album Free Spirit.

Critical reception
HotNewHipHop gave the album a 5-star rating, describing the project as one of his most experimental efforts to date in which he dabbles with elements of dancehall, R&B and afrobeats.

Track listing
Credits adapted from Tidal.

References

2019 debut albums
RCA Records albums
Hip hop albums by Canadian artists